Plain Dealing Middle/High School is public school in Plain Dealing, Louisiana, United States. It is a part of Bossier Parish Schools.

Sports Played

Football
Basketball M & F
Softball
Baseball
Track

Head Principals
Ms. Sandriana Isebaert (2014–Present)
Mr. Sayes (1994–2011)
Ms. Jefferson (2012–2013)

References

External links
 

Schools in Bossier Parish, Louisiana
Public middle schools in Louisiana
Public high schools in Louisiana